General James Francis Collins (September 2, 1905 – January 22, 1989) commanded the U.S. Army, Pacific from April 1961 until his retirement in 1964, and was President of the American Red Cross from 1964 until 1970.

Biography

James Francis Collins was born in The Bronx on September 2, 1905, and raised in the Van Nest neighborhood. A graduate of the United States Military Academy at West Point, he gained his commission in 1927 into the Field Artillery. He later attended the National War College. He also worked in the Hawaiian Division before the outbreak of World War II, during which he served exclusively in the Pacific Theater.

At the close of World War II, Collins commanded the I Corps Artillery in the Philippines and in Japan. From 1954 to 1957 he commanded the U.S. Army, Alaska. Afterward he commanded the 71st and 2nd Infantry Divisions before his tour in Hawaii. Other significant assignments include serving on the faculty of the Army War College and as Deputy Chief of Staff for Personnel, Department of the Army in Washington, D.C.

Collins was appointed President of the American Red Cross in 1964, one month after retiring from the Army. During his tenure he enhanced Red Cross services to American military personnel in Vietnam and to military hospitals worldwide.

He died from prostate cancer at Walter Reed Army Medical Center on January 22, 1989. He is buried with his wife Marian A. (1905–1986) at Arlington National Cemetery.

Decorations

Notes

References

External links
Generals of World War II

1905 births
1989 deaths
United States Army generals
United States Military Academy alumni
United States Army Command and General Staff College alumni
United States Army War College alumni
Burials at Arlington National Cemetery
Recipients of the Distinguished Service Medal (US Army)
Recipients of the Legion of Merit
American Red Cross personnel
Van Nest, Bronx
United States Army generals of World War II